Cameron Kashani also known as Cam Kashani is an Iranian-American entrepreneur, coach, speaker, and advisor. She works as a Global Speaker and an executive transformational coach, focused on women, "Awakening their Divine Feminine Leader", and previously the co-founder of Coloft, the first coworking space in Los Angeles.

Early life and education 
Kashani was born July 12, 1981 in Tehran, Iran. She received a bachelor's degree in marketing and entrepreneurship from California State University-Northridge, and received an MBA in Entrepreneurship and Marketing from Loyola Marymount University. She is also certified in Advanced Spiritual Psychology from the University of Santa Monica.

Career
Cam Kashani has her Doctorate in Spiritual Studies and helps women connect to and lead from their Divine Feminine. 

Previously, Kashani co-founded MedMinister.com, a web-based document delivery portal. This was Kashani’s first startup. 

Kashani was the co-founder of Coloft, one of LA's first coworking spaces. Coloft focused on technology, startups and entrepreneurs, whose alumni include Uber LA, Instacart, Fullscreen, Ziprecruiter.

Kashani was the cofounder of COACCEL: The Human Accelerator, a leadership development program specializing in females.

Kashani is a speaker with the US State Department in a program to prevent terrorism called IIP. She has spoken globally on topics including entrepreneurism, technology, and women's issues.

Kashani is a Special Advisor of Innovation and Entrepreneurship to the US Ambassador to Kuwait and the US Embassy in Kuwait. She is on the Innovation Council for SoCal FWD.us, and Advisor for the Bixel Exchange.

References 

American chief executives
American business writers
Women business executives
Living people
Businesspeople from Los Angeles
American women chief executives
1981 births
21st-century American women